Stephanie Pohl may refer to:

 Stephanie Pohl (beach volleyball) (born 1978), German beach volleyball player
 Stephanie Pohl (cyclist) (born 1987), German cyclist